"I Never Felt Like This Before" is a song by British singer-songwriter Mica Paris. Released in March 1993 as the lead single from her third studio album, Whisper a Prayer (1993), it became her second top-20 hit on the UK Singles Chart and the highest-placing release from the album.

Critical reception
Pan-European magazine Music & Media wrote, "Together with Walden, Paris has "Americanised" her sound considerably. Now we all know who Whitney's main competitor will be." Head of music Clive Dickens at Chiltern Network/UK said, "This is a returning to form by Mica Paris, who always had a lot of credit here. Walden managed to get the very best out of her. It's an exceptional song that should have wide appeal. It should cross over from dance to hot ACE and EHR. It's a really great record to start the hour with." James Hamilton from Music Week RM Dance Update described it as a "sultry wailer".

Track listing

UK 7-inch single

UK 12-inch single

UK CD single

Personnel
Personnel are obtained from the Whisper a Prayer liner notes.

Performance credits
 Lead vocals – Mica Paris
 Background vocals – Claytoven Richardson, Kitty Beethoven, Sandy Griffith, Tony Lindsay, Nicole "Darlin' Nikki" Bradin

Instruments
 Keyboards – Narada Michael Walden, Mike Mani, Monty Seward
 Percussion – Narada Michael Walden

Technical and production
 Arrangement – Narada Michael Walden
 Songwriters – Narada Michael Walden, Sally Jo Dakota, Mica Paris
 Engineering – Marc 'Elvis' Reyburn, Mike Mani, John Poppo (Classic Club Mix), Tim Bran ("I Should've Known Better"), Nick Wollage ("Call Me by My Name")
 Engineering assistants – Jeff 'G' Gray
 Mastering – Bernie Grundman
 Mixing – David 'Frazeman' Frazer
 Production – Narada Michael Walden, Mike Mani, Monty Seward, Frankie Knuckles (Classic Club Mix)
 Programming – Mike Mani, Monty Seward

Charts

Weekly charts

Year-end charts

References

1993 singles
1993 songs
Island Records singles
Mica Paris songs
Songs written by Narada Michael Walden
Songs written by Sally Jo Dakota